Owleh Kari-ye Tula Rud (also Romanized as Owleh Karī-ye Ţūlā Rūd) is a village in Tula Rud Rural District, in the Central District of Talesh County, Gilan Province, Iran. At the 2006 census, its population was 822, in 168 families.

References 

Populated places in Talesh County